The 2022 FIVB Volleyball Women's World Championship features 24 teams. Three places are allocated to the hosts, the Netherlands and Poland, and the current titleholder, Serbia. Ten places were to be allocated to the top two teams from each of the 2021 Continental Championships that have not yet qualified as host or titleholder. Remaining places were to be allocated to the top eleven teams in the FIVB World Ranking that have not yet qualified through the first three criteria. Following the cancellation of the 2021 Asian Women's Volleyball Championship, AVC allocated two quota spots to China and Japan, the top two teams in the AVC Continental Ranking.

Qualification summary
On 1 March 2022, FIVB declared Russia and Belarus not eligible for international and continental competitions due to the ongoing war in Ukraine. As a result, Russia was disqualified.

Qualified teams
a 
b 
c 
d 
e
f

Timelines

Host countries
FIVB reserved berths for the 2022 FIVB Volleyball Women's World Championship host countries to participate in the tournament.

 from CEV (Europe)
 from CEV (Europe)

Current world champions
FIVB reserved a berth for the 2018 FIVB Volleyball Women's World Championship champions to participate in the tournament.

 from CEV (Europe)

CEV (Europe)

First round (EuroVolley 2019)

Of the 24 qualified teams, top eight teams excluding EuroVolley 2021 host countries qualified for the third round.

Pool A

Pool B

Pool C

Pool D

Ranking of the top twelve teams

Second round (EuroVolley 2021 qualification)

Of the 23 qualified teams, winners and runners-up of each group qualified for the third round.

Pool A

Pool B

Pool C

Pool D

Pool E

Pool F

Third round (EuroVolley 2021)

Of the 24 qualified teams, winner and runner-up excluding the Netherlands, Poland, and Serbia qualified for the 2022 FIVB Volleyball Women's World Championship.

CSV (South America)

First round (2021 South American Championship) 

Of the 5 participating teams, winners and runners-up qualified for the 2022 FIVB Volleyball Women's World Championship.

CAVB (African)

First round (2021 Women's African Nations Volleyball Championship) 

Of the 9 participating teams, winners and runners-up qualified for the 2022 FIVB Volleyball Women's World Championship.

NORCECA (North, Central America and Caribbean)

First round (2021 Women's NORCECA Volleyball Championship) 

Of the 7 participating teams, winners and runners-up qualified for the 2022 FIVB Volleyball Women's World Championship.

References

External links
Fédération Internationale de Volleyball – official website

qualification
2022